Cleannord Saintil (born February 11, 1984) is a former professional American football wide receiver. He was originally signed by the San Jose SaberCats of the Arena Football League as an undrafted free agent in 2007. He played college football for the Middle Tennessee State Blue Raiders.

Early years
Saintil was born in Naples, Florida. He played high school football at Naples High School and in his senior year led his team to the Florida 5A championship being named to both first-team all-state and all-county honors. In addition, he earned all-county honors for his basketball play and won the Florida Pop Warner football championship with his Naples Gators team when he was 14 years old.

College football
Saintil first attended Ranger College, a community college in Texas, in 2002, where he totalled 12 touchdowns and 964 yards on 43 catches, enough to earn Junior College All-American accolades. In 2003, he attended Highland Community College (Illinois) and earned All-Jayhawk Conference First-Team honors as a receiver and kick return specialist with 38 catches for 624 yards and 9 touchdowns, leading the conference in receptions and receiving yards per game.

He then went on to play two seasons of college football for the Middle Tennessee State University Blue Raiders from 2004 to 2005. In his first season there, he ranked third on the team with 40 receptions and scored a rushing touchdown as well as returning 11 kickoffs. In his final season, he made 11 starts and earned First Team All-Sun Belt Conference honors by leading the conference with 66 catches — the fifth-highest season total at MidTenn State. He also gained 379 yards on 17 kickoff returns.

Professional career
Saintil went undrafted in the 2006 NFL Draft and instead signed with the San Jose SaberCats of the Arena Football League. He played in five games in his rookie year, starting the season on the injury reserve list. Nonetheless, he was able to contribute with 7 touchdowns and 181 yards on 16 receptions and 8.5 tackles. He was the SaberCats leading receiver in the 2008 season when he caught 120 passes for 1,503 yards and 35 touchdowns. He also returned 9 kicks for 129 yards and, in the playoffs, caught 24 passes for 248 yards for 7 touchdowns. He dressed for the ArenaBowl XXII loss to the Philadelphia Soul.

On March 9, 2009, Saintil signed as a free agent with the Toronto Argonauts of the Canadian Football League but was released at the end of training camp.

References

Further reading

External links
Toronto Argonauts bio

1984 births
Living people
Sportspeople from Naples, Florida
Players of American football from Florida
American players of Canadian football
American football wide receivers
Canadian football wide receivers
Middle Tennessee Blue Raiders football players
San Jose SaberCats players
Toronto Argonauts players
Arizona Rattlers players
Tampa Bay Storm players
Florida Tarpons players
Ranger Rangers football players